Henry Powell (6 September 1907 – 3 March 1992) was an Australian rules footballer who played with Fitzroy in the Victorian Football League (VFL).

The son of Henry Charles Powell (1878–1930) and Margaret Agnes Powell (1877–1920), nee Ryan, Henry Powell was born at Brunswick, Victoria on 6 September 1907.

Notes

External links 

1907 births
1992 deaths
Australian rules footballers from Melbourne
Fitzroy Football Club players
People from Brunswick, Victoria